Boondelbah Island, also known as the Boondelbah Nature Reserve, is a protected nature reserve and uninhabited island lying  off the mouth of Port Stephens on the coast of New South Wales, Australia. The  reserve and island is one of two breeding sites of the nominate subspecies of the threatened Gould's petrel and, with the nearby Cabbage Tree Island which hosts the principal colony, has been classified by BirdLife International as an Important Bird Area.

Description
In contrast to rainforest-covered Cabbage Tree, Boondelbah is virtually treeless with the vegetation dominated by mat rush and coastal rosemary, with tussocks of paroo lily and knobby club rush. Prickly pear covers much of the cliff tops.

Conservation 
Access is only permitted for scientific and conservation purposes.

Fauna 
Little penguins breed on Boondelbah Island and shearwaters also roost there.

Gould's petrel conservation management
Although the larger Cabbage Tree Island had been known for its breeding colony of Gould's petrels for many years, it was only in 1995 that a few breeding birds were found on Boondelbah.  In order to establish a second colony, in February 1999 a hundred Gould's petrel chicks were translocated from Cabbage Tree to Boondelbah and placed in artificial nest boxes, with a further hundred being translocated in March 2000.  Almost all the chicks fledged successfully.

See also

 List of islands of New South Wales
 Protected areas of New South Wales

References

Islands of New South Wales
Island restoration
Important Bird Areas of New South Wales
Nature reserves in New South Wales
Mid-Coast Council
Uninhabited islands of Australia
Penguin colonies